Big Time is the first conventional live album by American musician Tom Waits, featuring performances from two shows on Waits' 1987 tour. The album was released less than a year later on Island Records. While Big Time was the first released recording of public concert performances by Waits, it was not strictly his first live release: his 1975 Nighthawks at the Diner was a live performance before an audience that was conducted entirely within a recording studio.

Background and production
In efforts to promote Franks Wild Years, Waits began a historic tour of North America and Europe in October 1987. The tour incorporated a theatrical aspect, as Franks Wild Years was recorded based on a play written by Waits himself about his then-alter-ego, Frank O'Brien. Waits described his alter ego, who was debuted on Swordfishtrombones as:
"Quite a guy. Grew up in a bird's eye frozen, oven-ready, rural American town where Bing, Bob, Dean, Wayne & Jerry are considered major constellations. Frank, mistakenly, thinks he can stuff himself into their shorts and present himself to an adoring world. He is a combination of Will Rogers and Mark Twain, playing accordion -- but without the wisdom they possessed. He has a poet's heart and a boy's sense of wonder with the world. A legend in Rainville since he burned his house down and took off for the Big Time."

The theatrical play, which premiered on June 17, 1986 at Chicago's Briar Street Theatre, ran for two months and received "mixed reviews".

Five of the final shows in North America were held at San Francisco's Warfield Theatre and Los Angeles' Wiltern Theatre in November 1987, shortly before Waits and his band left for Europe. Waits and his wife Kathleen Brennan then proposed the idea of releasing the recorded live footage as a concert film. Originally titled Crooked Time, Brennan played a large role in the development and eventual production of the idea.

During post-production of both the album and movie, Waits' voice was lowered in tone, apparently as both he and the producers wanted to "give more power to the songs." Several audio effects – such as the stamping of boots, finger snapping, maracas, gunshots, train whistles, traffic noise, laughter and applause – were also added in post-production. Additional footage from European performances in Dublin, Stockholm and Berlin was also added.

Musicians and personnel

Musicians and performers
Tom Waits – lead vocals, piano, guitar (on "Cold Cold Ground" and "Strange Weather"), organ (on "Falling Down"), percussion (on "16 Shells from a 30.6")
Marc Ribot – lead guitar, banjo, trumpet
Fred Tackett – guitar (on "Falling Down")	
Greg Cohen – electric bass, basstarda, alto horn
Larry Taylor – double bass (on "Falling Down")
Ralph Carney – saxophone, clarinets, baritone horn
Willy Schwarz – accordion, hammond organ, sitar, conga
Michael Blair – drums, percussion, bongos, brake drum
Richie Hayward – drums (on "Falling Down")

Personnel and production
Tom Waits – producer
Kathleen Brennan – producer
Catharins Masters – additional production
Biff Dawes – engineer, mixer

Track listing
All tracks written by Tom Waits, except where noted.

Tracks marked (*) on CD and cassette only; omitted from LP.
 
Songs from the movie not on the released soundtrack:

References

	 

1988 live albums
Tom Waits live albums
Island Records live albums